The Lycée Alexandre Dumas (LAD) is a French international school in Port-au-Prince, Haiti. It has primaire (primary school) and collège-lycée (junior and senior high school) levels.

Lycée Alexandre Dumas, a university preparatory school, is considered to be an "elite" institution within Haiti.

References

External links
 Lycée Alexandre Dumas

Port-au-Prince
Schools in Haiti
Port-au-Prince